Wise Quacks is a 1939 Warner Bros. Looney Tunes animated short film directed by Bob Clampett. The cartoon was released on August 5, 1939, and stars Porky Pig and Daffy Duck.

A different design of Daffy was used in this cartoon.  In this cartoon, Daffy has a light-colored mask around his eyes and a zig-zag ring around his neck. This design would be used one more time in Porky's Last Stand in 1940 and some advertisements during the time.

Plot
Mrs. Daffy surprises Daffy with the news that she has several eggs waiting to be hatched. Porky reads the announcement of the expecting duck duo in the newspaper. The eggs hatch as Porky comes to congratulate his old friend. Later, an eagle tries to make off with one of the babies. Daffy, still drunk off of corn juice from both worrying about the birth as well as celebrating the hatchlings, pursues the birdnapper. The eagle gathers reinforcements to take on the drunk duck. Porky comes to the rescue to find Daffy and the gang of eagles all getting drunk together, much to Mrs. Daffy's dismay.

Notes
When Mrs. Daffy tries to hide her secret from her husband, which revealed to be a baby-sized knitted shirt, the animation was reused from other Merrie Melodies cartoons, I Wish I Had Wings (1932) and Let It Be Me (1936).

The scene when Mrs. Daffy tries to speed up the hatching process of her eggs and the hatchlings begged their mother not to, was reused in a later Looney Tunes cartoon, Booby Hatched (1944).

The scene where the eagle is hunting for his prey and his allies were flying to his aid are reused from an earlier cartoon, Porky's Poultry Plant (1936).

References

External links

 

1939 films
1939 animated films
1930s American animated films
1930s animated short films
Looney Tunes shorts
American black-and-white films
Films directed by Bob Clampett
Daffy Duck films
Porky Pig films
Films scored by Carl Stalling